Rafael Dias may refer to:

Rafaël Dias (born 1991), Portuguese footballer who plays as a midfielder
Rafael Dias (footballer) (born 1983), Brazilian footballer who plays as a centre back